Robin Hamilton is a former Democratic Party member of the Montana House of Representatives, representing District 92 from January 2005 to January 2011. He did not seek re-election in 2010 and was succeeded by Democrat Bryce Bennett.

External links
Follow the Money - Robin Hamilton
2008 2006 2004 campaign contributions

Members of the Montana House of Representatives
Living people
Year of birth missing (living people)